Mahika Kandanala (born 6 August 2001) is an American cricketer. In August 2019, she was named in United States' squad for the 2019 ICC Women's World Twenty20 Qualifier tournament in Scotland. She made her Women's Twenty20 International (WT20I) debut for the United States women's cricket team on 5 September 2019, against the Netherlands, in the 2019 ICC Women's World Twenty20 Qualifier.

In February 2021, she was named in the Women's National Training Group by the USA Cricket Women's National Selectors ahead of the 2021 Women's Cricket World Cup Qualifier and the 2021 ICC Women's T20 World Cup Americas Qualifier tournaments. In October 2021, she was named in the American team for the 2021 Women's Cricket World Cup Qualifier tournament in Zimbabwe.

References

External links
 

2001 births
Living people
People from Carrollton, Texas
American people of Telugu descent
American sportspeople of Indian descent
American women cricketers
United States women Twenty20 International cricketers
21st-century American women